Shaping Seattle: Buildings is an online map application produced by the Seattle Department of Planning and Development. Its purpose is to provide information about buildings in Seattle under construction to the public. Users who click on the location of a construction site on the interactive map can see sketches, building timelines, project documents and information about upcoming public meetings.

References

External links
http://www.seattle.gov/dpd/shapingseattle/map.aspx

Government of Seattle
Web applications